Hakea collina is a shrub in the Proteaceae native to eastern Australia. A small many branched shrub with gnarled branches with attractive cream-yellowish flowers.

Description
Smaller branches and leaves have fine flattened silky hairs that remain until flowering. Flowers in the colder months from May to July.

Taxonomy
Hakea collina  was first formally described by the botanist Cyril Tenison White in 1944 as part of the work Contributions to the Queensland Flora as published in the Proceedings of the Royal Society of Queensland.
The specific epithet (collina) is derived from the Latin word collinus meaning "of a hill" or "hilly", referring to the habitat where the shrub occurs.

Distribution
It is endemic to an area in the south west of Queensland on lateritic tableland on hills and plains as a part of open Acacia woodland and shrubland communities.

Conservation status

Hakea collina is classified as 'Poorly Known' in J.D.Briggs & J.H.Leigh, "Rare or Threatened Australian Plants" (1995).

References

collina
Flora of Queensland
Plants described in 1944